Adita Wahi   is an Indian television actress, model and anchor. She is best known for her roles as Sonali Swaika in the TV show, Laut Aao Trisha (2014) and as Shefali Goenka in Saarrthi (2007). Adita was a finalist in the Femina Miss India beauty pageant.

Early life
Adita was born in New Delhi, India. She completed her schooling at Convent of Jesus and Mary, Delhi. She took up a summer internship at Weekenders - a popular clothing retailer. Within a few years, Adita was merchandising for one of the largest clothing exporters in Delhi. Subsequently, Adita moved to New York City to pursue a specialized program in merchandising at the Fashion Institute of Technology. While in New York she fell in love with theater and acting and eventually decided to focus her time and energy pursuing her love of acting. She attended the Lee Strasberg Theatre and Film Institute in New York.

Television

Films

References

External links
 

Actresses from New Delhi
Indian television actresses
Actresses in Hindi television
Actresses in Hindi cinema
Indian film actresses
21st-century Indian actresses
Living people
Year of birth missing (living people)